The following is a list of ecoregions in the United Kingdom as identified by the World Wide Fund for Nature (WWF).

Terrestrial

Temperate broadleaf and mixed forests
Celtic broadleaf forests
Celtic rainforest
English Lowlands beech forests
North Atlantic moist mixed forests

Temperate coniferous forests
Caledonian conifer forests

Freshwater
 Central & Western Europe
 Northern British Isles

Marine
 Celtic Seas
 North Sea

References 
 Abell, R., M. Thieme, C. Revenga, M. Bryer, M. Kottelat, N. Bogutskaya, B. Coad, N. Mandrak, S. Contreras-Balderas, W. Bussing, M. L. J. Stiassny, P. Skelton, G. R. Allen, P. Unmack, A. Naseka, R. Ng, N. Sindorf, J. Robertson, E. Armijo, J. Higgins, T. J. Heibel, E. Wikramanayake, D. Olson, H. L. Lopez, R. E. d. Reis, J. G. Lundberg, M. H. Sabaj Perez, and P. Petry. (2008). Freshwater ecoregions of the world: A new map of biogeographic units for freshwater biodiversity conservation. BioScience 58:403-414, .
 Spalding, Mark D., Helen E. Fox, Gerald R. Allen, Nick Davidson et al. "Marine Ecoregions of the World: A Bioregionalization of Coastal and Shelf Areas". Bioscience Vol. 57 No. 7, July/August 2007, pp. 573–583.

 
United Kingdom
Eco
ecoregions